Blondel is a surname. Notable people with the surname include:

 André Blondel (1863–1938), French scientist and engineer
 Antoine Blondel (1795–1886), French politician
 David Blondel (1591–1655), French Protestant clergyman and scholar
 François Blondel (1618–1686), French mathematician and engineer, author of Cours d'Architecture
 Georges Blondel (1856–1948), French historian
 Henri Blondel (1821–1897), French architect
 Jacques-François Blondel (1705–1774), French architect
 Jean Blondel (1929–2022), French political scientist
 Jean-François Blondel (1683–1756), French architect
 Jonathan Blondel (born 1984), Belgian footballer
 Louis Blondel (1885–1967), Swiss archaeologist
 Maurice Blondel (1861–1949), French Catholic philosopher
 Vincent Blondel (born 1965), Belgian professor of applied mathematics